Thomas Bottomley (26 December 1910 – 19 February 1977) was an English first-class cricketer, who played in six matches for Yorkshire County Cricket Club in 1934 and 1935.

Born in Rawmarsh, Yorkshire, England, Bottomley was a right-handed batsman.  He scored 142 runs at 20.28 with a best of 51 against Essex, and took the wicket of Jack Davies of Kent with his right arm medium bowling at a total cost of 188 runs. Five of his games came in 1934, with a solitary County Championship appearance in the following year.

He died aged 66, in February 1977, in Rotherham.

References

External links
Cricinfo Profile
Cricket Archive Statistics

1910 births
1977 deaths
Yorkshire cricketers
People from Rawmarsh
English cricketers